Alexandrovka is a rural locality (a selo) in Kamyshlinsky Selsoviet, Karmaskalinsky District, Bashkortostan, Russia. The population was 188 as of 2010.

Geography 
It is located 27 km from Karmaskaly and 5 km from Kamyshlinka.

References 

Rural localities in Karmaskalinsky District